Nocardiopsis nanhaiensis  is a Gram-positive and aerobic bacterium from the genus of Nocardiopsis which has been isolated from the South China Sea.

References 

Actinomycetales
Bacteria described in 2015